Lenograstim is a recombinant granulocyte colony-stimulating factor which functions as an immunostimulator. It is developed  by Chugai Pharmaceuticals under the brand name Granocyte.

References 

Immunostimulants